Pirwata (Aymara and Quechua pirwa granary, deposit, -ta a suffix, also spelled Pirhuata) is a  mountain in the Bolivian Andes. It is located in the Cochabamba Department, on the border of the Ayopaya Province, Morochata Municipality, and the Quillacollo Province, Quillacollo Municipality.

References 

Mountains of Cochabamba Department
Five-thousanders of the Andes